Cymopterus terebinthinus is a perennial plant in the carrot family Apiaceae with leaves that look like parsley and grows in the Great Basin of the American West. Common names include Aromatic spring-parsley, northern Indian parsnip, and turpentine cymopterus.

Name
Cymopterus means "wavy wing", referring to the fruit. Terebinthinus ('of turpentine') refers to the pungent smell of the plant's oil.

Description

Growth pattern

Leaves and stems
Leaves are ovate overall, but finely pinnately dissected into segments like parsley leaves. Leaves are strongly aromatic when crushed. "Terebinthus" means "like-turpentine", referring to the scented oils in the plant.

Inflorescence and fruit

Distribution and habitat
It can be found in the Toiyabe Range and Deep Creek Mountains.

Ecology
It is a host for Papilio indra.

Some Plateau Indian tribes chewed the roots to treat colds and sores.

References

terebinthinus
Flora of California
Flora of Oregon
Flora of the Great Basin
Endemic flora of the United States
Plants used in traditional Native American medicine